Hilton Dummett (21 April 1917 – 4 December 1965) was a Guyanese cricketer. He played in one first-class match for British Guiana in 1938/39.

See also
 List of Guyanese representative cricketers

References

External links
 

1917 births
1965 deaths
Guyanese cricketers
Guyana cricketers